Prípad Barnabáš Kos (The Case of Barnabáš Kos) is a 1964 Czechoslovak film directed by Peter Solan. The film starred Josef Kemr.

References

External links
 

1964 films
Czechoslovak comedy films
Slovak-language films
Slovak comedy films